The World Wrestling Association was an Indianapolis-based professional wrestling promotion which was operated by Dick the Bruiser and his business partner Wilbur Snyder. It was affiliated with the larger American Wrestling Association and recognized its champions, along with its own and those of the Indianapolis-based Powerful Women of Wrestling. It ran from 1964 to 1989.

History
The World Wrestling Association (WWA), operating under the legal name Championship Wrestling of Indiana, Inc., was established in 1964 by William Afflis and Wilbur Snyder. The duo purchased the Indianapolis NWA promotion in 1964 from its longtime owner Jim Barnett, who at that time was attempting to start up a promotion in Australia. The name of the promotion was taken from the former promotions in the Chicago and Los Angeles areas.

In 1965, the WWA purchased the Chicago-based Fred Kohler Enterprises from Fred Kohler. In May of the same year, the promotion ceased promoting events in Detroit. 

The promotion developed wrestlers such as Bobby Heenan and amateur wrestler Greg Wojciechowski. Wojciechowski wrestled for the WWA under the name "The Great Wojo" and held the WWA World Heavyweight Championship three times. In later years, Scott Steiner got his start in the WWA under his real name, Scott Rechsteiner.

A talent sharing agreement with American Wrestling Association (AWA) head (and longtime champion) Verne Gagne brought forth other talent, including The Crusher and Baron von Raschke. The WWA also put on joint wrestling events with the AWA starting in 1966. In 1971, the WWA returned to promoting events in Detroit in competition with NWA Detroit until 1975.

The WWA tried to make a go of it in the mid-1980s, when Vince McMahon's World Wrestling Federation (WWF) was buying regional promotions across the country, but the Bruiser's advancing age and the talent drain to the WWF was too much and the WWA ceased promoting matches in 1989.

Championships
 WWA World Heavyweight Championship
 WWA World Tag Team Championship

Notes

References

External links
WWAsuperstarwrestling.com
WWA title histories at Wrestling-Titles.com
World Wrestling Association alumni at Cagematch.net
World Wrestling Association alumni at OWW.com
World Wrestling Association alumni at Wrestlingdata.com

Independent professional wrestling promotions based in the Midwestern United States
1964 establishments in Indiana